Ismaël Ehui (born 10 December 1986) is a French footballer who plays as a striker. He played in the Football League for Scunthorpe United.

Career
Ismael signed a two-year professional contract at Fulham football club after being prolific in front of goal for the youth and reserve team, he then signed a one-year extension. In late February 2006, Ehui joined Football League One side Scunthorpe United on loan to gain vital experience, and to also help them with their survival in League One. He made his debut for the Iron coming on as a second-half substitute in their 3–1 away win at Gillingham. In March 2008, Ehui joined Isthmian League Premier Division side Carshalton Athletic on loan for the rest of the season to assist in their relegation fight. He made an immediate impact with the club, scoring three goals in his first two games and also winning a penalty to set up another. After his release from Fulham in 2008, he then joined Harrow Borough where he had a brief spell. In June 2009 he left Ermis Aradippou to sign with Belgian provincial team R.R.F.C. Montegnée.

Ehui signed for Southern League Division One Central side Northwood in September 2014, joining his younger brother Joakim at the club, but left in the summer of 2015.

After leaving Northwood, Ehui signed for Conference South side Hayes & Yeading United on 3 August 2015, after impressing in pre-season. Ehui later joined Isthmian League side Hendon on dual-registration in December 2015. He later had a short spell with Flackwell Heath before rejoining Northwood in September 2016.

Ehui has since had spells with Chalfont St Peter, Potters Bar Town, Hanwell Town, North Greenford United and Broadfields United. He then returned for a short third spell at Northwood between 2021 and 2022, before departing the club. He also returned for a short spell at Broadfields United.

Personal life
Ehui's younger brother Joakim and cousin Georges are also footballers.

References

External links
Ismael Ehui at Aylesbury United

1986 births
French footballers
Footballers from Lille
Living people
Carshalton Athletic F.C. players
English Football League players
Scunthorpe United F.C. players
French people of Nigerian descent
Fulham F.C. players
French expatriate sportspeople in Belgium
Harrow Borough F.C. players
French expatriate sportspeople in England
R.R.F.C. Montegnée players
Northwood F.C. players
Hayes & Yeading United F.C. players
Hendon F.C. players
Flackwell Heath F.C. players
Chalfont St Peter A.F.C. players
Potters Bar Town F.C. players
Hanwell Town F.C. players
North Greenford United F.C. players
Broadfields United F.C. players
Expatriate footballers in England
Ermis Aradippou FC players
Expatriate footballers in Cyprus
Cypriot Second  Division players
Association football forwards
Expatriate footballers in Belgium
Isthmian League players
Southern Football League players
National League (English football) players